Hideko Takahashi is a children's book illustrator. She was born in Osaka, Japan and educated in at Doshisha University in Kyoto, Japan. In 1990, she moved to Los Angeles to attend Otis College of Art and Design. Her work is included in Cooper Hewitt Museum. She did her a majority of schooling and education life in Kyoto, Japan, until later she moved to the U.S. in 1990 to attend Otis. After graduation, in 1994, she began to work as a freelance illustrator. Since then, she has made a professional career out of creating numerous illustrations for children's books, including: Beach Play, Good Night God Bless, Hot Dog on TV, Lull-a-bye Little One, The Ding Dong Clock, In My New Yellow Shirt, My Loose Tooth and Come to My Party and Other Shape Poems, Matthew's Truck and Princess Fun. Lynn Plourde, author of Snow Day, writes of Takahashi, "Hideko's illustrations have such kid-appeal and look deceptively simple (with basic colors and shapes), but they are filled with fun angles and perspectives and amazing details (cards look like real playing cards, and a braided rug is so textured you want to touch it)." In 2001, Takahashi moved to her adopted home of Seattle, which is now her favorite city.

Education 
Graduated from Doshisha University, Kyoto, Japan

Graduated from Otis College of Art and Design, Los Angeles in 1994.

Area of Interests 
Hideko Takahashi has professionally worked in illustrating for numerous children’s books, magazines, and educational materials, and her area of interests are in her specialty and among her favorite things which includes playful illustrations of children, dogs, and bugs. Active interests at home where she fondly recalls drawing and watching TV at the same time - which she still enjoys to this day.

Achievements 
 Certificate of Merit 38th Annual Illustration West, Society of Illustrators of Los Angeles
 Bank Street College of Education’s Best Children’s Books of the Year 2001 for In My New Yellow Shirt
 Los Angeles Times Best Children’s Books, 2002 for Snow Day
 Chicago Public Library’s Best of the Best Books of 2004, Bank Street College of Education’s Best Children’s Books of the Year 2005 and Cooperative Children’s Book Center’s Choices 2005 for Come to My Party and Other Shaped Poems
 2009 Kansas State Reading Circle Recommended Reading and Cooperative Children’s Book Center’s Choices 2008 for The Peace Bell

Client List 
 Candlewick Press
 Carus Publishing Company
 Childcraft
 Dial (Penguin, USA)
 G. P. Putnam’s Sons (Penguin, USA)
 Harcourt
 Henry Holt and Company
 Houghton Mifflin
 Japan-America Society of the State of Washington
 Kar-Ben Publishing
 Lee & Low Books
 MacMillan McGraw-Hill
 Mudpuppy
 New Harbinger Publications
 Nick Jr. Magazine
 Pig Toe Press
 Random House
 Rigby
 Running Press
 Scholastic
 Sesame Street Magazine
 Simon and Schuster
 Sterling Publishing
 Taiwan Wisdom Publishing

Selected books 
 Beach Play; by Marsha Hayles
 Good Night, God Bless; by Susan Heyboer O'Keefe
 Hot Dog on TV; by Karen T. Taha
 Lull-a-bye Little One; Dianne Ochiltree
 The Ding Dong Clock; by Carol H. Behrman
 In My New Yellow Shirt; by Eileen Spinelli
 My Loose Tooth; by Stephen Krensky
 Come to My Party and Other Shape Poems; by Heidi Roemer

External links 
 Walker Books
 Lindgren & Smith Portfolio
 Otis College of Art and Design Outstanding Alumni
 Author Feature: Dianne Ochiltree
 Hideko Takahashi

References

Japanese illustrators
Otis College of Art and Design alumni
Living people
Year of birth missing (living people)